Entoconcha is a genus of very small parasitic sea snails, marine gastropod mollusks in the family Eulimidae.

These small snails live in the perivisceral coelom of sea cucumbers.

Species
Species within this genus include the following:
 Entoconcha mirabilis (J. Mueller, 1852)

Species brought into synonymy
 Entoconcha muelleri (Semper, 1868): synonym of Enteroxenos muelleri (Semper, 1868)
 Entoconcha parasita (Baur, 1864): synonym of Entoconcha mirabilis (J. Mueller, 1852)

References

External links
 Nomenclator Zoologicus info
 Google books link to Tryon & Pilsbry's Manual of Conchology, 1886

Eulimidae